Goongoongup Bridge is a railway bridge in East Perth, Western Australia which crosses the Swan River and forms part of the Armadale line. It opened on 24 July 1995 as part of the electrification of Perth's suburban railway network. The name is derived from the Nyungar word for the Claisebrook area.

Goongoongup Bridge replaced the 1932 built timber Bunbury Bridge which was demolished in 1996. It had replaced the original 1893 structure that was damaged by floods.

A dual-use pedestrian/cycle pathway is beneath the main deck.

Repairs

In 2002, movement of soil on the eastern end of the bridge was detected.

Repair work by the  Public Transport Authority commenced in August 2011 and was completed in early 2013.

References

External links

Armadale and Thornlie lines
Bridges completed in 1995
Burswood, Western Australia
East Perth, Western Australia
Railway bridges in Perth, Western Australia
South Western Railway, Western Australia
Swan River (Western Australia)